Dmitry Valeryevich Stotsky (born 1 December 1989) is a Russian professional football player who plays for Pari NN. His current position is right back, but he has been deployed to many other positions, including left back and wide midfielder on either side.

Club career
On 15 May 2018, he moved from FC Ufa to FC Krasnodar, signing a 4-year contract. On 25 January 2022, his contract with Krasnodar was terminated by mutual consent. On the next day, he signed with Nizhny Novgorod.

International
He made his debut for the Russia national football team on 10 September 2018 in a friendly against Czech Republic.

Career statistics

Club

References

External links
 
 
 

1989 births
Living people
Sportspeople from Kaliningrad
Russian footballers
Russia international footballers
Association football defenders
Association football midfielders
FC Baltika Kaliningrad players
FC Ufa players
FC Krasnodar players
FC Nizhny Novgorod (2015) players
Russian First League players
A Lyga players
Russian Premier League players
Russian expatriate footballers
Expatriate footballers in Lithuania
Russian expatriate sportspeople in Lithuania